Košíře is a district of Prague, part of the municipal area Prague 5. It is situated in the valley of the Motol brook between the districts Smíchov and Motol. Košíře became a town in 1896 and was joined onto Prague in 1921.

History 

Košíře was a village until the second half of the 19th century. Thanks to the development of industry it was necessary to build accommodation there, because workers were moving there. The first electric tram in Prague was also tested there on the tram line from Anděl to Košíře (today Kavalírka).

Characteristics 

Košíře is a mostly residential district. Košíře is also the location for many embassies, such as the Indonesian and Vietnamese.

Neighboring districts 

Jinonice
Radlice
Smíchov
Motol
Strahov

References 

Districts of Prague